Coastal defence (Commonwealth) or Coastal defense (US) may refer to:

Coastal management, the protection of the coast from the action of wind, wave and tide
Coastal defence and fortification, the protection of the coast against military or naval attack